Futebol Clube Cesarense (abbreviated as FC Cesarense) is a Portuguese football club based in Cesar, Oliveira de Azeméis in the district of Aveiro.

Background
FC Cesarense currently plays in the Campeonato de Portugal which is the third tier of Portuguese football. The club was founded in 1932 and they play their home matches at the Estádio Mergulhão in Cesar, Oliveira de Azeméis. The stadium is able to accommodate 5,000 spectators.

The club is affiliated to Associação de Futebol de Aveiro and has competed in the AF Aveiro Taça. The club has also entered the national cup competition known as Taça de Portugal on occasions.

Current squad

Season to season

Honours
Terceira Divisão: 2011/12
AF Aveiro 1ª Divisão: 1982/83, 1984/85, 2008/09
AF Aveiro 2ª Divisão: 1957/58, 1971/72, 1972/73
AF Aveiro Taça: 	2007/08

Footnotes

External links
Official website 

Football clubs in Portugal
Association football clubs established in 1932
1932 establishments in Portugal